Delta Research Centre is an autonomous government research institute under the University of Dhaka system that researches the Bengal delta in Bangladesh and is located in Dhaka, Bangladesh. Bangladesh is made of the largest delta in the world.

History
Delta Research Centre was established in June 1991. It is governed by a Board of Governors which is headed by the Vice Chancellor of the University of Dhaka. The centre researched Open-pit mining in Phulbari coal mine. The centre has faced difficulties into conducting research due to lack of necessary equipments and funds.

References

Research institutes in Bangladesh
1991 establishments in Bangladesh
Organisations based in Dhaka